Diceroprocta azteca is a species of cicada in the family Cicadidae. It is found in Central America, North America, and South America.

References

Further reading

 
 
 

Diceroprocta
Articles created by Qbugbot
Insects described in 1909